Mascagnia is a genus in the Malpighiaceae, a family of about 75 genera of flowering plants in the order Malpighiales. The genus Mascagnia comprises about 45 species that occur in diverse habitats from northern Mexico and the Caribbean to northern Argentina and south-eastern Brazil.

Mascagnia in the traditional sense of was a highly polyphyletic assemblage, a form-genus based on the lateral-winged samaras. Since the mid-1980s, morphological and molecular studies led to the removal of discordant elements, which were assigned to the genera Adelphia, Aenigmatanthera, Alicia, Amorimia, Calcicola, Callaeum, Carolus, Christianella, Malpighiodes, Niedenzuella, and Psychopterys. In addition, phylogenetic analyses showed that Triopterys is nested within Mascagnia. The species formerly assigned to Triopterys were transferred to Mascagnia, which is now a monophyletic genus.

The correct name for the species often called Mascagnia macroptera in the horticulture trade is Callaeum macropterum; the names are not interchangeable. Most of the plants sold in the US under the names Callaeum macropterum and Mascagnia macroptera are actually Callaeum septentrionale.

Species currently recognized

References

Anderson, W. R. 2006. Eight segregates from the neotropical genus Mascagnia (Malpighiaceae). Novon 16: 168–204.
Anderson, W. R., and S. Corso. 2007. Psychopterys, a new genus of Malpighiaceae from Mexico and Central America. Contr. Univ. Michigan Herb. 25: 113–135.
Anderson, W. R., and C. Davis, 2007. Generic adjustments in Neotropical Malpighiaceae. Contributions from the University of Michigan Herbarium 25: 137–166.
Anderson, W. R., and C. C. Davis. 2012. Proposal to conserve the name Mascagnia against Triopterys (Malpighiaceae). Taxon 61: 1124–1125.
Anderson, W. R., and C. C. Davis. 2013. Combination of Mascagnia and Triopterys. Memoirs of the New York Botanical Garden 108: 191–203.
Davis,  C. C., and W. R. Anderson. 2010. A complete phylogeny of Malpighiaceae inferred from nucleotide sequence data and morphology. American Journal of Botany 97: 2031–2048.
Johnson, D. M. Revision of the neotropical genus Callaeum (Malpighiaceae). Systematic Botany 11: 335–353.

External links 
Malpighiaceae - description, taxonomy, phylogeny, and nomenclature
Mascagnia
Adelphia
Aenigmatanthera
Alicia
Amorimia
Calcicola
Callaeum
Carolus
Christianella
Malpighiodes
Niedenzuella
Psychopterys

Malpighiaceae
Taxonomy articles created by Polbot
Malpighiaceae genera